Western Rail Switching  was a switching and terminal railroad, operating a line west of Spokane, Washington.

Ownership
It was owned by Western Rail, Inc., a leasing company.

In 2004, Spokane County bought the Burlington Northern and Santa Fe Railway's Geiger Spur, and designated WRS to operate it, beginning in October.

Following the takeover of the nearby Palouse River and Coulee City Railroad by the Eastern Washington Gateway Railroad (EWG), the Washington Department of Transportation financed a newly constructed connection to the new short line operator.

Opening
This realignment was opened on January 2, 2009, bypassing Fairchild Air Force Base, through which the spur had run.

The west end of the spur is now at the Eastern Washington Gateway Railroad, near Medical Lake.

Operator
Not long after beginning operations, EWG filed with the Surface Transportation Board to replace WRS as operator, and now runs the Geiger Spur an exclusive operator.

Cargo Traffic
Traffic carried on the Geiger Spur consists primarily of inbound steel loads.

References

External links

Eastern Washington Gateway Railroad (official site)

Washington (state) railroads
Switching and terminal railroads
Railway companies established in 2004
Spin-offs of the BNSF Railway